Sunnhordland is a local Norwegian newspaper published five times a week in the municipality of Stord in Hordaland county. 

The newspaper was first published on May 1, 1902. The newspaper was started by Jens Hystad and has been owned by his family for its entire duration. Sunnhordland launched its online version as the third most-recent daily newspaper in Norway to do so on April 20, 2006.

The newspaper covers events in the municipalities of Bømlo, Fitjar, Kvinnherad, Stord, and Tysnes. The newspaper's office is located in Leirvik in the municipality of Stord. The paper is edited by Magne Kydland.

Circulation
According to the Norwegian Audit Bureau of Circulations and National Association of Local Newspapers, Sunnhordland has had the following annual circulation:
 2006: 7,985
 2007: 7,832
 2008: 7,832
 2009: 7,498
 2010: 7,137
 2011: 7,036
 2012: 6,697
 2013: 6,559
 2014: 6,571
 2015: 6,218
 2016: 6,129

References

External links
Sunnhordland homepage

Daily newspapers published in Norway
Norwegian-language newspapers
Stord
Mass media in Hordaland
Publications established in 1902
1902 establishments in Norway